The Bush Beast was a wooden roller coaster located at Wonderland Sydney in Australia. The ride opened with the park on 7 December 1985 and closed with the park on 26 April 2004. The ride features a mirrored layout to that of other wooden roller coasters located at California's Great America, Canada's Wonderland, and Kings Dominion. The Bush Beast was manufactured by Taft Broadcasting.

See also
 The Grizzly
 Grizzly (Kings Dominion)
 Wilde Beast

References

External links
 Bush Beast Roller Coaster at YouTube
 Australia's Wonderland Sydney – The Bush Beast at YouTube
 
 The Bush Beast at Parkz
 The Bush Beast at Wonderland History

Roller coasters in Australia
Wonderland Sydney
1985 establishments in Australia